The cities, towns and locations in Bardhaman district, a former district in West Bengal, India, are divided among six subdivisions, which contain 2 municipal corporations, 9 municipalities and 31 community development blocks. The community development blocks in turn contain census towns and out-growths, as well as rural areas. Bardhaman district has 70 official urban units and many other smaller towns and villages. As of 2001 the total population was 6,919,698, of which 4,347,275 was rural and 2,572,423 was urban.

Subdivisions

Subdivisions contain Municipal Corporations and Municipalities, classified as urban, and predominantly rural community development blocks. 
The subdivisions as of 2001 were:

Community development blocks and municipal areas

Subdivisions are divided into community development blocks and municipal areas (M).
Community development blocks contain Census Towns and Out Growths, which are classified as urban, and rural areas.
The community development blocks and municipal areas as of 2001 were:

Urban units
Urban units include Municipal Corporations (MC), Municipalities (M), Census Towns (CT) and Out Growths (OG),
As of 2001 they were:

Other locations

Other villages include Amgoria, Badulia, Bamshore, Channa village, Charanpur, Gangpur, Gonna Serandi, Jhamatpur, Kaigram, Kasba, Kuara, Kumirkola, Majida, Muidhara, Pahalanpur, Paharhati, Palitpur, Panchula,  Putsuri, Routhgram, Sankari, Srikhanda, Uchalan and Udaypur Kalna Burdwan.

References

Purba Bardhaman district
Paschim Bardhaman district